The 2005 Philadelphia Phillies season was the 123rd season in the history of the franchise.  The Phillies finished in second place in the National League East with a record of 88–74, two games behind the Atlanta Braves, and one game behind the NL Champion Houston Astros, who won the NL Wild Card race for the second consecutive season.  The Phillies were managed by their new manager Charlie Manuel, as they played their home games at Citizens Bank Park.  First baseman Ryan Howard was named the National League Rookie of the Year for the 2005 season.

Offseason
 October 29, 2004: Chris Coste signed as a free agent with the Philadelphia Phillies.
 November 15, 2004: AJ Hinch was signed as a free agent with the Philadelphia Phillies.
 December 3, 2004: Kenny Lofton was traded by the New York Yankees to the Philadelphia Phillies for Felix Rodriguez.

Regular season
On September 14, 2005, Andruw Jones of the Atlanta Braves hit his 300th career home run which went 430 feet off Phils reliever Geoff Geary in a 12–4 Phillies win. The ball landed in the upper deck in left field.
The Phillies again contended for the wild card down to the last day of the season. But, an 0–6 record against the eventual wild card winning Houston Astros doomed the team. One loss included a game on September 7, in which the Phillies led 6-5 in the ninth inning. With Billy Wagner on the mound, the Phillies gave up a fielding error and an infield single with two outs before Craig Biggio went up to the plate. Biggio subsequently lined a deep shot into left field that gave them an 8-6 lead that the Phillies did not recover from.

As a result of another year out of the playoffs, general manager Ed Wade was fired at the end of the season.

Season standings

National League East

Record vs. opponents

Transactions
May 14, 2005: Marlon Byrd was traded by the Philadelphia Phillies to the Washington Nationals for Endy Chávez.
June 8, 2005: Ugueth Urbina was traded by the Detroit Tigers with Ramón Martínez to the Philadelphia Phillies for Plácido Polanco.

Game log

|- style="background:#bfb"
| 1 || April 4 || Nationals || 8–4 || Jon Lieber (1–0) || Liván Hernández (0–1) || None || 44,080 || 1–0
|- style="background:#fbb"
| 2 || April 6 || Nationals || 3–7 || Joey Eischen (1–0) || Tim Worrell (0–1) || None || 23,435 || 1–1
|- style="background:#fbb"
| 3 || April 7 || Nationals || 4–5 (10) || Chad Cordero (1–0) || Rhéal Cormier (0–1) || None || 21,693 || 1–2
|- style="background:#fbb"
| 4 || April 8 || @ Cardinals || 5–6 || Al Reyes (1–0) || Ryan Madson (0–1) || Jason Isringhausen (2) || 50,074 || 1–3
|- style="background:#bfb"
| 5 || April 9 || @ Cardinals || 10–4 || Gavin Floyd (1–0) || Jeff Suppan (0–1) || None || 39,242 || 2–3
|- style="background:#bfb"
| 6 || April 10 || @ Cardinals || 13–4 || Jon Lieber (2–0) || Chris Carpenter (1–1) || None || 37,971 || 3–3
|- style="background:#bfb"
| 7 || April 11 || @ Marlins || 4–1 || Brett Myers (1–0) || Al Leiter (0–1) || Billy Wagner (1) || 11,416 || 4–3
|- style="background:#fbb"
| 8 || April 12 || @ Marlins || 2–8 || A. J. Burnett (1–1) || Randy Wolf (0–1) || None || 15,129 || 4–4
|- style="background:#fbb"
| 9 || April 13 || @ Marlins || 0–4 || Dontrelle Willis (2–0) || Cory Lidle (0–1) || None || 14,427 || 4–5
|- style="background:#fbb"
| 10 || April 15 || Braves || 4–11 || Horacio Ramírez (1–0) || Gavin Floyd (1–1) || None || 31,408 || 4–6
|- style="background:#bfb"
| 11 || April 16 || Braves || 2–1 || Jon Lieber (3–0) || John Smoltz (0–3) || Billy Wagner (2) || 36,820 || 5–6
|- style="background:#bfb"
| 12 || April 17 || Braves || 2–1 (10) || Ryan Madson (1–1) || Dan Kolb (0–2) || None || 32,008 || 6–6
|- style="background:#bfb"
| 13 || April 18 || Mets || 5–4 || Randy Wolf (1–1) || Kaz Ishii (0–2) || Tim Worrell (1) || 25,236 || 7–6
|- style="background:#fbb"
| 14 || April 19 || Mets || 4–16 || Víctor Zambrano (1–1) || Vicente Padilla (0–1) || None || 28,063 || 7–7
|- style="background:#fbb"
| 15 || April 20 || Rockies || 4–7 || Jamey Wright (1–1) || Cory Lidle (0–2) || None || 25,961 || 7–8
|- style="background:#bfb"
| 16 || April 21 || Rockies || 6–3 || Jon Lieber (4–0) || Joe Kennedy (1–2) || Billy Wagner (3) || 21,749 || 8–8
|- style="background:#fbb"
| 17 || April 22 || @ Braves || 2–6 || Mike Hampton (2–0) || Brett Myers (1–1) || Dan Kolb (6) || 26,837 || 8–9
|- style="background:#fbb"
| 18 || April 23 || @ Braves || 1–11 || Tim Hudson (2–0) || Randy Wolf (1–2) || None || 31,656 || 8–10
|- style="background:#fbb"
| 19 || April 24 || @ Braves || 0–4 || John Thomson (2–2) || Vicente Padilla (0–2) || None || 26,713 || 8–11
|- style="background:#bfb"
| 20 || April 25 || @ Nationals || 5–4 || Cory Lidle (1–2) || Zach Day (1–2) || Billy Wagner (4) || 24,956 || 9–11
|- style="background:#fbb"
| 21 || April 26 || @ Nationals || 1–3 || John Patterson (2–1) || Jon Lieber (4–1) || Chad Cordero (4) || 23,332 || 9–12
|- style="background:#bfb"
| 22 || April 27 || @ Nationals || 3–0 || Rhéal Cormier (1–1) || Esteban Loaiza (0–2) || Billy Wagner (5) || 27,483 || 10–12
|- style="background:#fbb"
| 23 || April 29 || Marlins || 4–6 || A. J. Burnett (3–1) || Randy Wolf (1–3) || Todd Jones (1) || 28,471 || 10–13
|- style="background:#fbb"
| 24 || April 30 || Marlins || 1–2 (6) || Dontrelle Willis (5–0) || Vicente Padilla (0–3) || None || 25,900 || 10–14
|-

|- style="background:#bfb"
| 25 || May 1 || Marlins || 8–6 || Cory Lidle (2–2) || Josh Beckett (4–2) || Billy Wagner (6) || 37,306 || 11–14
|- style="background:#fbb"
| 26 || May 2 || @ Mets || 1–5 || Pedro Martínez (3–1) || Terry Adams (0–1) || None || 16,897 || 11–15
|- style="background:#bfb"
| 27 || May 3 || @ Mets || 10–3 || Brett Myers (2–1) || Tom Glavine (1–4) || None || 17,051 || 12–15
|- style="background:#fbb"
| 28 || May 4 || @ Mets || 2–3 || Jae Weong Seo (2–1) || Randy Wolf (1–4) || Braden Looper (5) || 21,356 || 12–16
|- style="background:#fbb"
| 29 || May 5 || @ Mets || 5–7 || Aaron Heilman (3–2) || Vicente Padilla (0–4) || Braden Looper (6) || 19,553 || 12–17
|- style="background:#bfb"
| 30 || May 6 || @ Cubs || 3–2 || Billy Wagner (1–0) || LaTroy Hawkins (1–3) || None || 38,767 || 13–17
|- style="background:#bfb"
| 31 || May 7 || @ Cubs || 4–1 || Jon Lieber (5–1) || Glendon Rusch (2–1) || Billy Wagner (7) || 38,933 || 14–17
|- style="background:#fbb"
| 32 || May 8 || @ Cubs || 1–2 || Carlos Zambrano (3–1) || Brett Myers (2–2) || None || 38,656 || 14–18
|- style="background:#bfb"
| 33 || May 9 || @ Brewers || 4–2 || Randy Wolf (2–4) || Víctor Santos (1–2) || Billy Wagner (8) || 11,103 || 15–18
|- style="background:#fbb"
| 34 || May 10 || @ Brewers || 5–8 || Julio Santana (1–1) || Terry Adams (0–2) || Ricky Bottalico (1) || 12,082 || 15–19
|- style="background:#fbb"
| 35 || May 11 || @ Brewers || 2–5 || Doug Davis (4–4) || Cory Lidle (2–3) || Derrick Turnbow (5) || 13,175 || 15–20
|- style="background:#fbb"
| 36 || May 12 || Reds || 5–7 || Ramón Ortiz (1–1) || Jon Lieber (5–2) || Danny Graves (9) || 33,663 || 15–21
|- style="background:#bfb"
| 37 || May 13 || Reds || 12–2 || Brett Myers (3–2) || Eric Milton (2–4) || None || 27,071 || 16–21
|- style="background:#fbb"
| 38 || May 14 || Reds || 4–12 || Aaron Harang (2–2) || Ryan Madson (1–2) || None || 30,189 || 16–22
|- style="background:#bfb"
| 39 || May 15 || Reds || 4–3 || Vicente Padilla (1–4) || Elizardo Ramírez (0–1) || Billy Wagner (9) || 41,141 || 17–22
|- style="background:#bfb"
| 40 || May 17 || Cardinals || 7–5 || Cory Lidle (3–3) || Jeff Suppan (3–4) || Billy Wagner (10) || 32,103 || 18–22
|- style="background:#fbb"
| 41 || May 18 || Cardinals || 4–8 || Chris Carpenter (6–2) || Jon Lieber (5–3) || None || 29,130 || 18–23
|- style="background:#bfb"
| 42 || May 19 || Cardinals || 7–4 || Brett Myers (4–2) || Jason Marquis (5–3) || None || 38,229 || 19–23
|- style="background:#bfb"
| 43 || May 20 || @ Orioles || 9–3 || Randy Wolf (3–4) || Daniel Cabrera (3–3) || None || 34,642 || 20–23
|- style="background:#fbb"
| 44 || May 21 || @ Orioles || 0–7 || Érik Bédard (5–1) || Vicente Padilla (1–5) || None || 42,331 || 20–24
|- style="background:#bfb"
| 45 || May 22 || @ Orioles || 7–2 || Cory Lidle (4–3) || Sidney Ponson (5–2) || None || 41,614 || 21–24
|- style="background:#fbb"
| 46 || May 23 || @ Marlins || 2–5 || Dontrelle Willis (8–1) || Jon Lieber (5–4) || Todd Jones (7) || 11,944 || 21–25
|- style="background:#fbb"
| 47 || May 24 || @ Marlins || 3–4 (10) || John Riedling (2–0) || Amaury Telemaco (0–1) || None || 18,419 || 21–26
|- style="background:#bfb"
| 48 || May 25 || @ Marlins || 8–5 || Randy Wolf (4–4) || Al Leiter (2–5) || Billy Wagner (11) || 17,165 || 22–26
|- style="background:#bfb"
| 49 || May 27 || @ Braves || 5–1 || Cory Lidle (5–3) || John Smoltz (3–4) || None || 31,501 || 23–26
|- style="background:#bfb"
| 50 || May 28 || @ Braves || 12–5 || Jon Lieber (6–4) || Horacio Ramírez (3–4) || None || 34,975 || 24–26
|- style="background:#fbb"
| 51 || May 29 || @ Braves || 2–7 || Tim Hudson (6–3) || Brett Myers (4–3) || None || 37,615 || 24–27
|- style="background:#bfb"
| 52 || May 31 || Giants || 5–2 || Randy Wolf (5–4) || Brett Tomko (4–7) || None || 23,456 || 25–27
|-

|- style="background:#bfb"
| 53 || June 1 || Giants || 10–6 || Ryan Madson (2–2) || LaTroy Hawkins (1–5) || None || 24,546 || 26–27
|- style="background:#bfb"
| 54 || June 2 || Giants || 6–5 || Jon Lieber (7–4) || Brad Hennessey (2–2) || Billy Wagner (12) || 25,589 || 27–27
|- style="background:#bbb"
| – || June 3 || Diamondbacks || colspan=6 | Postponed (rain); Makeup: June 4 as a traditional double-header
|- style="background:#bfb"
| 55 || June 4 (1) || Diamondbacks || 10–6 || Vicente Padilla (2–5) || Javier Vázquez (5–4) || None || see 2nd game || 28–27
|- style="background:#bfb"
| 56 || June 4 (2) || Diamondbacks || 5–3 || Brett Myers (5–3) || Russ Ortiz (4–5) || Billy Wagner (13) || 43,449 || 29–27
|- style="background:#bfb"
| 57 || June 5 || Diamondbacks || 7–6 || Randy Wolf (6–4) || Brad Halsey (4–3) || Billy Wagner (14) || 37,582 || 30–27
|- style="background:#fbb"
| 58 || June 6 || Diamondbacks || 8–10 || Brandon Webb (7–2) || Cory Lidle (5–4) || Javier López (2) || 25,570 || 30–28
|- style="background:#bfb"
| 59 || June 7 || Rangers || 8–5 || Jon Lieber (8–4) || Ryan Drese (4–6) || Billy Wagner (15) || 33,616 || 31–28
|- style="background:#bfb"
| 60 || June 8 || Rangers || 2–0 || Aaron Fultz (1–0) || Chris Young (5–3) || Billy Wagner (16) || 24,339 || 32–28
|- style="background:#bfb"
| 61 || June 9 || Rangers || 10–8 || Vicente Padilla (3–5) || Pedro Astacio (2–7) || Billy Wagner (17) || 25,205 || 33–28
|- style="background:#bfb"
| 62 || June 10 || Brewers || 5–2 || Ryan Madson (3–2) || Matt Wise (0–2) || None || 27,225 || 34–28
|- style="background:#bfb"
| 63 || June 11 || Brewers || 7–5 || Rhéal Cormier (2–1) || Ricky Bottalico (0–1) || Ugueth Urbina (10) || 33,455 || 35–28
|- style="background:#bfb"
| 64 || June 12 || Brewers || 6–2 || Cory Lidle (6–4) || Ben Sheets (2–6) || None || 40,385 || 36–28
|- style="background:#fbb"
| 65 || June 14 || @ Mariners || 1–3 || Gil Meche (6–4) || Jon Lieber (8–5) || Eddie Guardado (18) || 26,818 || 36–29
|- style="background:#fbb"
| 66 || June 15 || @ Mariners || 1–5 || Aaron Sele (6–5) || Vicente Padilla (3–6) || None || 26,019 || 36–30
|- style="background:#bfb"
| 67 || June 16 || @ Mariners || 3–2 (13) || Geoff Geary (1–0) || Julio Mateo (2–2) || Billy Wagner (18) || 27,162 || 37–30
|- style="background:#bfb"
| 68 || June 17 || @ Athletics || 6–1 || Robinson Tejeda (1–0) || Barry Zito (3–8) || None || 15,601 || 38–30
|- style="background:#fbb"
| 69 || June 18 || @ Athletics || 1–2 || Kirk Saarloos (3–4) || Cory Lidle (6–5) || Justin Duchscherer (1) || 20,332 || 38–31
|- style="background:#fbb"
| 70 || June 19 || @ Athletics || 2–5 || Joe Blanton (3–6) || Jon Lieber (8–6) || Justin Duchscherer (2) || 30,619 || 38–32
|- style="background:#fbb"
| 71 || June 21 || Mets || 5–8 || Kris Benson (6–2) || Brett Myers (5–4) || Braden Looper (14) || 43,050 || 38–33
|- style="background:#bfb"
| 72 || June 22 || Mets || 8–4 || Ryan Madson (4–2) || Royce Ring (0–2) || None || 42,640 || 39–33
|- style="background:#fbb"
| 73 || June 23 || Mets || 3–4 || Kaz Ishii (2–6) || Cory Lidle (6–6) || Braden Looper (15) || 45,449 || 39–34
|- style="background:#fbb"
| 74 || June 24 || Red Sox || 0–8 || Tim Wakefield (6–6) || Jon Lieber (8–7) || None || 45,090 || 39–35
|- style="background:#fbb"
| 75 || June 25 || Red Sox || 1–7 || Matt Clement (9–1) || Vicente Padilla (3–7) || None || 44,868 || 39–36
|- style="background:#fbb"
| 76 || June 26 || Red Sox || 8–12 || Mike Timlin (2–1) || Rhéal Cormier (2–2) || None || 45,042 || 39–37
|- style="background:#fbb"
| 77 || June 28 || @ Mets || 3–8 || Víctor Zambrano (4–6) || Robinson Tejeda (1–1) || None || 39,898 || 39–38
|- style="background:#bfb"
| 78 || June 29 || @ Mets || 6–3 || Cory Lidle (7–6) || Kaz Ishii (2–7) || Billy Wagner (19) || 24,915 || 40–38
|- style="background:#fbb"
| 79 || June 30 || @ Mets || 3–5 || Pedro Martínez (9–2) || Jon Lieber (8–8) || Braden Looper (16) || 36,667 || 40–39
|-

|- style="background:#fbb"
| 80 || July 1 || Braves || 1–9 || John Smoltz (9–5) || Vicente Padilla (3–8) || None || 45,004 || 40–40
|- style="background:#bfb"
| 81 || July 2 || Braves || 6–4 || Brett Myers (6–4) || Horacio Ramírez (7–5) || Billy Wagner (20) || 29,205 || 41–40
|- style="background:#fbb"
| 82 || July 3 || Braves || 3–4 || Jim Brower (3–1) || Billy Wagner (1–1) || Chris Reitsma (7) || 39,732 || 41–41
|- style="background:#bfb"
| 83 || July 4 || @ Pirates || 12–1 || Cory Lidle (8–6) || Dave Williams (6–6) || None || 37,259 || 42–41
|- style="background:#fbb"
| 84 || July 5 || @ Pirates || 0–3 || Kip Wells (6–8) || Ryan Madson (4–3) || None || 13,442 || 42–42
|- style="background:#bfb"
| 85 || July 6 || @ Pirates || 5–0 || Vicente Padilla (4–8) || Mark Redman (4–8) || None || 19,961 || 43–42
|- style="background:#fbb"
| 86 || July 7 || @ Pirates || 1–2 || Zach Duke (1–0) || Brett Myers (6–5) || José Mesa (21) || 20,942 || 43–43
|- style="background:#fbb"
| 87 || July 8 || Nationals || 7–8 || Ryan Drese (7–7) || Robinson Tejeda (1–2) || Chad Cordero (31) || 44,688 || 43–44
|- style="background:#bfb"
| 88 || July 9 || Nationals || 1–0 || Billy Wagner (2–1) || Héctor Carrasco (3–2) || None || 33,365 || 44–44
|- style="background:#bfb"
| 89 || July 10 || Nationals || 5–4 (12) || Rhéal Cormier (3–2) || Sun-Woo Kim (1–2) || None || 34,124 || 45–44
|- style="background:#bbcaff;"
| – || July 12 ||colspan="7" |2005 Major League Baseball All-Star Game at Comerica Park in Detroit
|- style="background:#bfb"
| 90 || July 14 || Marlins || 13–7 || Brett Myers (7–5) || A. J. Burnett (5–6) || None || 29,660 || 46–44
|- style="background:#fbb"
| 91 || July 15 || Marlins || 7–9 || Brian Moehler (5–6) || Cory Lidle (8–7) || Todd Jones (14) || 30,233 || 46–45
|- style="background:#bfb"
| 92 || July 16 || Marlins || 10–5 || Jon Lieber (9–8) || Scott Olsen (1–1) || None || 33,268 || 47–45
|- style="background:#bfb"
| 93 || July 17 || Marlins || 8–4 || Vicente Padilla (5–8) || Dontrelle Willis (13–5) || None || 36,419 || 48–45
|- style="background:#bfb"
| 94 || July 19 || Dodgers || 5–4 (10) || Billy Wagner (3–1) || Yhency Brazobán (2–5) || None || 29,349 || 49–45
|- style="background:#fbb"
| 95 || July 20 || Dodgers || 2–10 || Derek Lowe (6–10) || Cory Lidle (8–8) || None || 31,164 || 49–46
|- style="background:#fbb"
| 96 || July 21 || Dodgers || 0–1 || Odalis Pérez (5–5) || Jon Lieber (9–9) || Yhency Brazobán (17) || 36,232 || 49–47
|- style="background:#bfb"
| 97 || July 22 || Padres || 8–6 (11) || Aaron Fultz (2–0) || Paul Quantrill (2–1) || None || 28,600 || 50–47
|- style="background:#bfb"
| 98 || July 23 || Padres || 2–0 || Robinson Tejeda (2–2) || Pedro Astacio (2–9) || Billy Wagner (21) || 33,992 || 51–47
|- style="background:#bfb"
| 99 || July 24 || Padres || 5–1 || Brett Myers (8–5) || Brian Lawrence (5–10) || None || 35,322 || 52–47
|- style="background:#fbb"
| 100 || July 25 || @ Astros || 1–7 || Andy Pettitte (8–7) || Cory Lidle (8–9) || None || 36,029 || 52–48
|- style="background:#fbb"
| 101 || July 26 || @ Astros || 1–2 || Roy Oswalt (14–8) || Ryan Madson (4–4) || None || 33,867 || 52–49
|- style="background:#fbb"
| 102 || July 27 || @ Astros || 2–3 || Roger Clemens (9–4) || Vicente Padilla (5–9) || Brad Lidge (24) || 38,071 || 52–50
|- style="background:#bfb"
| 103 || July 28 || @ Rockies || 8–5 || Ugueth Urbina (2–3) || Mike DeJean (4–2) || Billy Wagner (22) || 22,015 || 53–50
|- style="background:#bfb"
| 104 || July 29 || @ Rockies || 5–3 || Brett Myers (9–5) || José Acevedo (2–1) || Billy Wagner (23) || 21,855 || 54–50
|- style="background:#bfb"
| 105 || July 30 || @ Rockies || 8–7 || Cory Lidle (9–9) || Aaron Cook (0–1) || Billy Wagner (24) || 33,418 || 55–50
|- style="background:#fbb"
| 106 || July 31 || @ Rockies || 2–9 || Jeff Francis (10–7) || Jon Lieber (9–10) || None || 21,807 || 55–51
|-

|- style="background:#fbb"
| 107 || August 2 || Cubs || 1–2 || Carlos Zambrano (8–4) || Vicente Padilla (5–10) || Ryan Dempster (15) || 32,585 || 55–52
|- style="background:#bfb"
| 108 || August 3 || Cubs || 4–3 || Billy Wagner (4–1) || Mike Remlinger (0–3) || None || 34,727 || 56–52
|- style="background:#bfb"
| 109 || August 4 || Cubs || 6–4 || Brett Myers (10–5) || Mark Prior (7–4) || Billy Wagner (25) || 37,882 || 57–52
|- style="background:#fbb"
| 110 || August 5 || Brewers || 1–3 (10) || Ben Sheets (8–7) || Geoff Geary (1–1) || Matt Wise (1) || 31,759 || 57–53
|- style="background:#bfb"
| 111 || August 6 || Brewers || 8–2 || Jon Lieber (10–10) || Chris Capuano (12–7) || None || 35,800 || 58–53
|- style="background:#fbb"
| 112 || August 7 || Brewers || 0–2 || Tomo Ohka (7–6) || Vicente Padilla (5–11) || Derrick Turnbow (24) || 35,017 || 58–54
|- style="background:#bfb"
| 113 || August 9 || @ Dodgers || 8–4 || Ryan Madson (5–4) || Steve Schmoll (2–1) || None || 44,556 || 59–54
|- style="background:#bfb"
| 114 || August 10 || @ Dodgers || 9–5 || Ugueth Urbina (3–3) || Yhency Brazobán (2–7) || None || 44,001 || 60–54
|- style="background:#fbb"
| 115 || August 11 || @ Dodgers || 1–5 || Odalis Pérez (7–6) || Cory Lidle (9–10) || None || 44,963 || 60–55
|- style="background:#bfb"
| 116 || August 12 || @ Padres || 3–2 || Jon Lieber (11–10) || Jake Peavy (10–5) || Billy Wagner (26) || 41,153 || 61–55
|- style="background:#bfb"
| 117 || August 13 || @ Padres || 5–2 || Ugueth Urbina (4–3) || Trevor Hoffman (1–5) || Billy Wagner (27) || 37,777 || 62–55
|- style="background:#bfb"
| 118 || August 14 || @ Padres || 8–3 || Robinson Tejeda (3–2) || Chan Ho Park (9–6) || None || 37,167 || 63–55
|- style="background:#fbb"
| 119 || August 15 || Nationals || 3–6 || Liván Hernández (14–5) || Brett Myers (10–6) || None || 40,627 || 63–56
|- style="background:#bbb"
| – || August 16 || Nationals || colspan=6 | Postponed (rain); Makeup: August 18 as a day-night double-header
|- style="background:#bfb"
| 120 || August 17 || Nationals || 4–3 || Jon Lieber (12–10) || Esteban Loaiza (7–9) || Billy Wagner (28) || 33,450 || 64–56
|- style="background:#bfb"
| 121 || August 18 (1) || Nationals || 2–1 || Vicente Padilla (6–11) || Tony Armas (7–6) || Billy Wagner (29) || 30,046 || 65–56
|- style="background:#fbb"
| 122 || August 18 (2) || Nationals || 4–5 || Luis Ayala (8–6) || Ugueth Urbina (4–4) || Chad Cordero (39) || 34,492 || 65–57
|- style="background:#fbb"
| 123 || August 19 || Pirates || 2–11 || Kip Wells (7–12) || Robinson Tejeda (3–3) || None || 32,992 || 65–58
|- style="background:#bfb"
| 124 || August 20 || Pirates || 6–1 || Brett Myers (11–6) || Dave Williams (10–9) || None || 43,192 || 66–58
|- style="background:#bfb"
| 125 || August 21 || Pirates || 4–3 || Ryan Madson (6–4) || Rick White (3–6) || Billy Wagner (30) || 40,689 || 67–58
|- style="background:#fbb"
| 126 || August 22 || @ Giants || 0–5 || Noah Lowry (10–11) || Jon Lieber (12–11) || None || 38,947 || 67–59
|- style="background:#bfb"
| 127 || August 23 || @ Giants || 10–2 || Vicente Padilla (7–11) || Brett Tomko (7–14) || None || 37,892 || 68–59
|- style="background:#bfb"
| 128 || August 24 || @ Giants || 7–4 || Robinson Tejeda (4–3) || Brad Hennessey (4–6) || Billy Wagner (31) || 36,812 || 69–59
|- style="background:#bfb"
| 129 || August 26 || @ Diamondbacks || 11–3 || Aaron Fultz (3–0) || Brad Halsey (8–11) || None || 22,397 || 70–59
|- style="background:#fbb"
| 130 || August 27 || @ Diamondbacks || 0–2 || Brandon Webb (11–10) || Jon Lieber (12–12) || José Valverde (5) || 26,903 || 70–60
|- style="background:#fbb"
| 131 || August 28 || @ Diamondbacks || 5–10 || Claudio Vargas (8–7) || Vicente Padilla (7–12) || None || 31,112 || 70–61
|- style="background:#fbb"
| 132 || August 30 || @ Mets || 4–6 || Juan Padilla (1–0) || Ugueth Urbina (4–5) || Braden Looper (28) || 36,505 || 70–62
|- style="background:#bfb"
| 133 || August 31 || @ Mets || 8–2 || Brett Myers (12–6) || Pedro Martínez (13–6) || None || 43,780 || 71–62
|-

|- style="background:#bfb"
| 134 || September 1 || @ Mets || 3–1 || Jon Lieber (13–12) || Tom Glavine (10–12) || Billy Wagner (32) || 38,316 || 72–62
|- style="background:#bfb"
| 135 || September 2 || @ Nationals || 7–1 || Vicente Padilla (8–12) || John Halama (1–3) || None || 28,939 || 73–62
|- style="background:#fbb"
| 136 || September 3 || @ Nationals || 4–5 (12) || Héctor Carrasco (4–3) || Aquilino López (0–1) || None || 30,561 || 73–63
|- style="background:#fbb"
| 137 || September 4 || @ Nationals || 1–6 || Esteban Loaiza (10–10) || Gavin Floyd (1–2) || None || 32,251 || 73–64
|- style="background:#fbb"
| 138 || September 5 || Astros || 3–4 || Andy Pettitte (14–9) || Brett Myers (12–7) || Brad Lidge (33) || 36,144 || 73–65
|- style="background:#fbb"
| 139 || September 6 || Astros || 1–2 || Roy Oswalt (17–11) || Billy Wagner (4–2) || Brad Lidge (34) || 30,600 || 73–66
|- style="background:#fbb"
| 140 || September 7 || Astros || 6–8 || Chad Qualls (5–4) || Billy Wagner (4–3) || Brad Lidge (35) || 29,026 || 73–67
|- style="background:#bfb"
| 141 || September 9 || Marlins || 12–5 || Cory Lidle (10–10) || A. J. Burnett (12–10) || None || 32,933 || 74–67
|- style="background:#fbb"
| 142 || September 10 || Marlins || 6–7 || Chris Resop (1–0) || Ryan Madson (6–5) || Todd Jones (36) || 40,479 || 74–68
|- style="background:#bfb"
| 143 || September 11 || Marlins || 11–1 || Jon Lieber (14–12) || Ismael Valdez (2–2) || None || 34,794 || 75–68
|- style="background:#bfb"
| 144 || September 12 || Braves || 4–1 || Eude Brito (1–0) || Tim Hudson (12–8) || Billy Wagner (33) || 21,169 || 76–68
|- style="background:#bfb"
| 145 || September 13 || Braves || 5–4 || Aaron Fultz (4–0) || Blaine Boyer (2–2) || Billy Wagner (34) || 24,311 || 77–68
|- style="background:#bfb"
| 146 || September 14 || Braves || 12–4 || Cory Lidle (11–10) || Horacio Ramírez (11–9) || None ||  || 78–68
|- style="background:#fbb"
| 147 || September 15 || Braves || 4–6 || Jorge Sosa (12–3) || Brett Myers (12–8) || Kyle Farnsworth (13) || 27,804 || 78–69
|- style="background:#bfb"
| 148 || September 16 || @ Marlins || 13–3 || Jon Lieber (15–12) || Jim Mecir (1–4) || None || 30,853 || 79–69
|- style="background:#bfb"
| 149 || September 17 || @ Marlins || 10–2 || Ugueth Urbina (5–5) || Dontrelle Willis (21–9) || None || 27,203 || 80–69
|- style="background:#fbb"
| 150 || September 18 || @ Marlins || 1–7 || Josh Beckett (15–8) || Eude Brito (1–1) || None || 25,208 || 80–70
|- style="background:#fbb"
| 151 || September 20 || @ Braves || 1–4 || Jorge Sosa (13–3) || Cory Lidle (11–11) || None || 25,701 || 80–71
|- style="background:#bfb"
| 152 || September 21 || @ Braves || 10–6 (10) || Geoff Geary (2–1) || Kyle Davies (7–4) || None || 27,030 || 81–71
|- style="background:#bfb"
| 153 || September 22 || @ Braves || 4–0 || Jon Lieber (16–12) || Tim Hudson (13–9) || None || 26,301 || 82–71
|- style="background:#bfb"
| 154 || September 23 || @ Reds || 11–10 || Rhéal Cormier (4–2) || David Weathers (7–4) || Billy Wagner (35) || 22,608 || 83–71
|- style="background:#fbb"
| 155 || September 24 || @ Reds || 2–3 || Eric Milton (8–14) || Eude Brito (1–2) || David Weathers (15) || 31,632 || 83–72
|- style="background:#bfb"
| 156 || September 25 || @ Reds || 6–3 || Cory Lidle (12–11) || Randy Keisler (2–1) || Billy Wagner (36) || 23,072 || 84–72
|- style="background:#fbb"
| 157 || September 26 || Mets || 5–6 || Shingo Takatsu (2–2) || Ugueth Urbina (5–6) || Roberto Hernández (3) || 28,679 || 84–73
|- style="background:#fbb"
| 158 || September 27 || Mets || 2–3 || Juan Padilla (3–1) || Jon Lieber (16–13) || Aaron Heilman (4) || 36,150 || 84–74
|- style="background:#bfb"
| 159 || September 28 || Mets || 16–6 || Vicente Padilla (9–12) || Steve Trachsel (1–4) || None || 42,250 || 85–74
|- style="background:#bfb"
| 160 || September 30 || @ Nationals || 4–3 || Cory Lidle (13–11) || Liván Hernández (15–10) || Billy Wagner (37) || 30,375 || 86–74
|-

|- style="background:#bfb"
| 161 || October 1 || @ Nationals || 8–4 || Brett Myers (13–8) || John Patterson (9–7) || None || 32,903 || 87–74
|- style="background:#bfb"
| 162 || October 2 || @ Nationals || 9–3 || Jon Lieber (17–13) || Héctor Carrasco (5–4) || Billy Wagner (38) || 36,491 || 88–74
|-

Roster

First Washington Nationals game
On April 4, 2005, Brad Wilkerson (after being the last player to ever wear a Montreal Expo jersey) had the honor of being the first batter for the Washington Nationals and he promptly responded with the first hit in the new team's history. Nevertheless, Kenny Lofton hit a three-run homer and Jon Lieber pitched 5 effective innings, leading the home team Philadelphia Phillies to an 8–4 victory over the new Nationals at Citizens Bank Park.  (Lieber was credited with the win for the Phillies and would also score a win for Philadelphia in the last game of the 2005 Nationals season.)  Outfielder Terrmel Sledge hit the Nats' first home run in the April 4 contest.
 Scorecard

On April 6, 2005, the Washington Nationals recorded their first-ever regular season win by beating the Phillies, 7–3. The win came in their second game of the season and was highlighted by Wilkerson's hit for the cycle.

Player stats

Batting

Starters by position
Note: Pos= Position; G = Games played; AB = At bats; H = Hits; Avg. = Batting average; HR = Home runs; RBI = Runs batted in

Other batters
Note: G = Games played; AB = At bats; H = Hits; Avg = Batting average; HR = Home runs; RBI = Runs batted in

Pitching

Starting pitchers
Note: G = Games pitched; IP = Innings pitched, W = Wins; L = Losses; ERA = Earned run average; SO = Strikeouts

Other pitchers
Note: G = Games pitched; IP = Innings pitched; W = Wins; L = Losses; ERA = Earned run average; SO = Strikeouts

Relief pitchers
Note: G = Games pitched; W = Wins; L = Losses; SV = Saves; ERA = Earned run average; SO = Strikeouts

Farm system

References

2005 Philadelphia Phillies season at Baseball Reference

Philadelphia Phillies seasons
Philadelphia Phillies Season, 2005
Philadelphia Phillies